Alejandra Quereda Flores (born 24 July 1992 in Alicante) is a former Spanish group rhythmic gymnast.

Career 
Quereda represents her nation at international competitions. She participated at the 2012 Summer Olympics and the 2016 Summer Olympics. She also competed at World championships, including at the 2015 World Rhythmic Gymnastics Championships where she won the bronze medal in the Group All-around event.

Quereda competed at the 2016 Summer Olympics in Rio de Janeiro, Brazil where she was member of the Spanish group (together with Elena López, Artemi Gavezou, Sandra Aguilar, Lourdes Mohedano) that won silver medal in group-all around.

Detailed Olympic results

References

External links
 
 
 
 

1992 births
Living people
Spanish rhythmic gymnasts
Place of birth missing (living people)
Gymnasts at the 2012 Summer Olympics
Olympic gymnasts of Spain
Gymnasts at the 2015 European Games
European Games competitors for Spain
Gymnasts at the 2016 Summer Olympics
Medalists at the Rhythmic Gymnastics World Championships
Medalists at the Rhythmic Gymnastics European Championships
Olympic silver medalists for Spain
21st-century Spanish women